The Harvey River Formation is a geologic formation in Jamaica. It preserves bivalve fossils dating back to the Cretaceous period.

See also 
 List of fossiliferous stratigraphic units in Jamaica

References

Further reading 
 S. K. Donovan, S. F. Mitchell, and D. N. Lewis. 2006. The irregular echinoid Nucleopygus from the Upper Cretaceous of western Jamaica. Cretaceous Research 27:577-583

Geologic formations of Jamaica
Cretaceous Jamaica
Santonian Stage
Sandstone formations
Shale formations
Shallow marine deposits
Formations